Elvir Baljić (born 8 July 1974) is a Bosnian professional football manager and former player.

As a player, Baljić's biggest success was winning the UEFA Champions League with Spanish giant Real Madrid in the 1999–2000 season. Apart from the UEFA Champions League success, he also won the Turkish Süper Lig with Fenerbahçe in the 2000–01 season. 

After ending his playing career, he became an assistant manager of Safet Sušić at the Bosnia and Herzegovina national team, with whom he qualified for the 2014 FIFA World Cup. He was then, the manager of back then TFF First League club Karabükspor in 2015. After Karabükspor, Baljić was also an assistant of Sušić at Alanyaspor in 2017 and at Akhisarspor in 2018.

On 1 October 2019, he was named the new manager of Bosnian Premier League club Tuzla City, officially taking over that position a day later. He left the club on 9 March 2020, terminating his contract.

Club career

Early career
Born in Sarajevo, SR Bosnia and Herzegovina, SFR Yugoslavia, Baljić began his career with hometown club Željezničar, but in 1993, during the Bosnian War, he signed for FK Sarajevo. During his time with Sarajevo, he played eleven games, and scored eight goals.

Later, he moved to Turkey where he played for Bursaspor. Baljić was the best player at the club for several seasons, which made him an interesting target for the best Turkish clubs.

Fenerbahçe
In the summer of 1998, Baljić signed a contract with Turkish giants Fenerbahçe for a €9.3 million transfer fee. He spent a season at the Şükrü Saracoğlu Stadium scoring 18 goals in 30 appearances as the club finished the season in third place.

Real Madrid
Baljić's stellar performances at Fenerbahçe made the 25-year-old a target for various European clubs. Still, his €26 million transfer to Real Madrid under club president Lorenzo Sanz during summer 1999 caused a major surprise. The signing was initiated by Real Madrid's head coach John Toshack who knew Baljić well from Istanbul as the Welshman coached Beşiktaş while the Bosnian starred for Fenerbahçe. For more than a decade, the transfer fee paid by Real to Fenerbahçe for Baljić stood as the biggest sum of money paid for a player from ex-Yugoslavia, until Edin Džeko's January 2011 move from VfL Wolfsburg to Manchester City for £27 million (€32 million).

Just before the start of the 1999-2000 season in Spanish top flight, Baljić suffered rupture of both pairs of cruciate ligaments in his left knee, anterior (ACL) and posterior (PCL), after which he underwent surgery and was put off the field for prolonged rehabilitation. Subsequent loss of form caused Baljić's Real stint to turn sour pretty much immediately. Throughout the 1999–00 season, he made only 11 league appearances (8 of them as substitute), scoring just 1 goal. He never managed to secure a first team place, and the November 1999 sacking of Toshack followed by the arrival of new head coach Vicente del Bosque, marginalized Baljić even further. At the season's end, del Bosque included Baljić in the 18-man squad he took to Paris for the 2000 Champions League Final, but did not give him a single minute of action as Real beat compatriots Valencia CF.

During the 2000 summer transfer window, Baljić was sent back to Fenerbahçe on a loan deal.

Loan spells at Fenerbahçe and Rayo Vallecano
Baljić spent the entire 2000–01 season back at his old stomping grounds with Fenerbahçe. He simultaneously managed to recover some of his old form with 5 goals in 27 league appearances as Fenerbahçe won the Turkish Süper Lig.

In the following 2001–02 season, he got a chance to showcase his abilities closer to the club that still held his rights as he got loaned to Rayo Vallecano in La Liga, based within the city of Madrid. Baljić actually insisted on joining Rayo due to its proximity to Real as he had his eye on getting a fresh opportunity with the big club in the future. For their part, Real Madrid obliged and managed to hammer out a loan deal with Rayo. Also, there he joined countrymen and friends Elvir Bolić and Emir Granov, which Baljić cited as another reason he wanted to be at Rayo. At times they formed a forward line  'Baljić, Bolić and Bolo' along with a Basque who also had a similar name. However, the move did not do much to improve Baljić's standing at the Bernabéu as more injuries, poor form, and even disciplinary issues followed with only one league goal from 10 appearances.

During the 2002 summer transfer window, Baljić's Real contract was terminated and he again transferred back to Turkey - this time to Galatasaray. Due to his substantial price tag and the subsequent high-profile failure at Madrid, Baljić's acquisition by Real features consistently and prominently on various "worst-ever signing" lists.

Galatasaray and later career
Baljić turned just 28 years of age when he began his Galatasaray stint, but it soon became clear his best days were far behind him. His form was average at best and his overall interest in football seemed to be decreasing by the day. He said that he would retire on several occasions, but every time he would come back.

In December 2004, he left Galatasaray and in January 2005, signed with Konyaspor. After only half a season at Konyaspor, Baljić left the club and took a break from football at only the age of 31.

Baljić came back to the sport in January 2006, when he signed for Turkish side MKE Ankaragücü. In the 2006–07 and 2007–08 seasons, he played for İstanbulspor, before deciding to finish his career in July 2008 at the age of 34.

International career

Baljić's international career was prolific. He made his debut for Bosnia and Herzegovina in an April 1996 friendly match against Albania and has earned a total of 38 caps, scoring 14 goals. He will be remembered as the first, and for now only, player who scored four goals in a single official match for Bosnia and Herzegovina, in an away game of the Group 9, during the UEFA Euro 2000 qualifications, between Estonia and Bosnia and Herzegovina, on 9 October, just a couple of weeks after he signed a contract with Real Madrid. The final result was 1–4. His final international was a March 2005 FIFA World Cup qualification match against Lithuania.

Managerial career

Bosnia and Herzegovina
Almost two years after finishing his playing career, in February 2010, Bosnia and Herzegovina's national team manager Safet Sušić revealed that Baljić would be one of his assistants. While as an assistant, Baljić was part of the historic achievement of the national team, which was qualification to the 2014 FIFA World Cup in Brazil. Baljić left the national team in 2014 with Sušić's departure.

Karabükspor
On 2 October 2015, Baljić became the new manager of Turkish TFF First League club Karabükspor. Less than three months later, on 21 December 2015, he resigned from the position of Karabükspor manager after a 3–0 loss against Adanaspor, which was the club's third loss in a row in all competitions and second in a row in the league.

Konyaspor and Akhisarspor
During 2017 and 2018, Baljić had a roll as assistant manager of Safet Sušić again, and during that period, was the assistant at Süper Lig club Konyaspor in 2017 and one more Süper Lig club Akhisarspor in 2018.

Tuzla City
On 1 October 2019, it was announced that Baljić became the new manager of Bosnian Premier League club Tuzla City. The next day, on 2 October, Baljić officially took over the role of manager of Tuzla City, signing a three-year contract with the club. In his first game as Tuzla City manager, the club beat Zvijezda 09 at home 3–0 in a league match on 5 October 2019. He suffered his first loss with Tuzla on 19 October 2019, after the club lost to Radnik Bijeljina at home 0–3 in another league match.

In his first Tuzla derby, Baljić's team drew against city rivals Sloboda Tuzla 1–1 on 30 November 2019. On 9 March 2020, Baljić decided to terminate his contract with Tuzla City because of poor results, which culminated with an away 1–0 league loss against Željezničar the day earlier.

Career statistics

International goals
Scores and results list Bosnia and Herzegovina's goal tally first, score column indicates score after each Baljić goal.

Managerial statistics

Honours

Player
Real Madrid 
UEFA Champions League: 1999–2000

Fenerbahçe
Süper Lig: 2000–01

Individual
Awards
Bosnian Footballer of the Year: 1998, 1999
Turkish Footballer of the Year: 1998

References

External links

 

1974 births
Living people
Footballers from Sarajevo
Bosniaks of Bosnia and Herzegovina
Association football wingers
Bosnia and Herzegovina footballers
Bosnia and Herzegovina international footballers
UEFA Champions League winning players
FK Sarajevo players
Bursaspor footballers
Fenerbahçe S.K. footballers
Real Madrid CF players
Rayo Vallecano players
Galatasaray S.K. footballers
Konyaspor footballers
MKE Ankaragücü footballers
İstanbulspor footballers
Premier League of Bosnia and Herzegovina players
Süper Lig players
La Liga players
TFF First League players
Bosnia and Herzegovina expatriate footballers
Expatriate footballers in Turkey
Bosnia and Herzegovina expatriate sportspeople in Turkey
Turkish people of Bosnia and Herzegovina descent
Expatriate footballers in Spain
Bosnia and Herzegovina expatriate sportspeople in Spain
Bosnia and Herzegovina football managers
Kardemir Karabükspor managers
FK Tuzla City managers
Premier League of Bosnia and Herzegovina managers
Bosnia and Herzegovina expatriate football managers
Expatriate football managers in Turkey